Sarvedan (also Romanized as Sarvedān; also known as Sar Dūn, Sar-e Dūn, Sarv Dān, and Sarverān) is a village in Hotkan Rural District, in the Central District of Zarand County, Kerman Province, Iran. At the 2006 census, its population was 32, in 8 families.

References 

Populated places in Zarand County